Mian Dasht (also Romanized as Mīān Dasht) is a village in Babolrud Rural District, in the Central District of Babolsar County, Mazandaran Province, Iran. At the 2006 census, its population was 2,082, in 558 families.

References 

Populated places in Babolsar County